Regino Ramirez is a census-designated place (CDP) in Starr County, Texas, United States. This was a new CDP for the 2010 census with a population of 85.

Geography
Regino Ramirez is located at  (26.487985, -98.933774).

Education
It is in the Roma Independent School District.

References

Census-designated places in Starr County, Texas
Census-designated places in Texas